Kula Kangri is claimed by many authorities to be the highest mountain in Bhutan but this is disputed by others, who claim that Kula Kangri is wholly in Tibet. The first ascent was by a combined Japanese and Chinese team in 1986. The mountain is part of the Bhutan Himalaya.

Chinese and Japanese authorities claim nearby Gangkhar Puensum is higher, and the claim that Kula Kangri is in or on the border with Bhutan is challenged.

See also 
 List of countries by highest point
 List of highest mountains
 List of Ultras of the Himalayas
 Mountains of Bhutan

References 

Mountains of Tibet
Mountains of Bhutan
Bhutan–China border
International mountains of Asia
Seven-thousanders of the Himalayas